EV Aicall Zeltweg is an ice hockey team in Zeltweg, Austria. They play in the Austrian National League, the second level of ice hockey in Austria.

History
The club was created as EV Zeltweg in 1950. In 2007, they changed their name to EV Aicall Zeltweg.

External links
 Official site

Ice hockey teams in Austria
Austrian National League teams
Ice hockey clubs established in 1950
1950 establishments in Austria